Hugh Ross Williamson (1901–1978) was a prolific British popular historian, and a dramatist. Starting from a career in the literary world, and having a Nonconformist background, he became an Anglican priest in 1943.

In 1955 he became a convert to Roman Catholicism and wrote many historical works in a Catholic apologist tone. In 1956, he published his autobiography, The Walled Garden. Ross Williamson was critical of the reforms introduced by the Second Vatican Council.

Notes

Works

 The poetry of T. S. Eliot (1932)
 John Hampden: a life (1933)
 Rose and glove: a play (1934)
 After the event: a play in one act (1935)
 King James I (1935)
 Gods and mortals in love (1936)
 The seven deadly virtues; In a glass darkly; Various heavens: a play sequence. (1936)
 Cinderella's grandchild: a play in one act (1936)
 Mr Gladstone: a play in three acts (1937)
 Stories from history: ten plays for schools (1938)
 Who is for liberty? (1939)
 George Villiers, first Duke of Buckingham: study for a biography (1940)
 A.D. 33: a tract for the times (1941)
 Captain Thomas Schofield (1942)
 Paul, a bond slave: a radio play (1945)
 Charles and Cromwell (1946)
 The arrow and the sword: an essay in detection (1947)
 Queen Elizabeth: a play in three acts (1947)
 The story without an end (1947)
 Were you there ... ?: six meditations for Holy Week (1947)
 A wicked pack of cards (1947)
 The silver bowl (1948)
 The seven Christian virtues (1949)
 Four Stuart portraits (1949)
 The evidence for the Gunpowder Plot (1950)
 The Gunpowder Plot (1951)
 Sir Walter Raleigh (1951)
 Conversation with a ghost (1952)
 Jeremy Taylor (1952)
 The story without an end (1953)
 The ancient capital: an historian in search Of Winchester (1953)
 Canterbury Cathedral (1953)
 The children's book of British saints (1953)
 His eminence of England: a play in two acts (1953)
 The children's book of French saints (1954)
 The children's book of Italian saints (1955)
 The great prayer: concerning the canon of the Mass (1955)
 James: by the grace of God (1955)
 Historical whodunits (1955)
 The walled garden: an autobiography (1956)
 The beginning of the English Reformation (1957)
 Enigmas of history (1957)
 The day they killed the king (1957)
 The challenge of Bernadette (1958)
 The children's book of German saints (1958)
 The sisters (1958)
 The children's book of patron saints (1959)
 The conspirators and the crown (1959)
 Young people's book of the saints (1960)
 Teresa of Avila (1961)
 The day Shakespeare died (1961)
 The flowering hawthorn (1962)
 Guy Fawkes (1964)
 The modern Mass: a reversion to the reforms of Cranmer (1969)
 The cardinal in England (1970)
 The Florentine woman (1970)
 The last of the Valois (1971)
 Paris is worth a mass (1971)
 Kind Kit: an informal biography of Christopher Marlowe (1972)
 Catherine de' Medici (1973)
 Lorenzo the Magnificent (1974)
 Historical enigmas (1974)
 The princess a nun!: a novel without fiction (1978; completed by Julian Rathbone)

1901 births
1978 deaths
Converts to Roman Catholicism from Anglicanism
20th-century British dramatists and playwrights
20th-century British historians
British male dramatists and playwrights
20th-century British male writers